Me Myself I is the sixth studio album by British recording artist Joan Armatrading. Released in May 1980, the album was Armatrading's highest ever chart placing both in the UK (number 5) and in the US (number 28).  In Australia, the album peaked at number 13. It was certified "Gold" in the UK by the BPI in July 1980.

The title track became one of her most successful singles, peaking at number 21 over an 11-week stay in the UK Singles Chart. It was also used in the soundtrack of an Australian movie of the same title made in 1999. "All the Way From America" was a minor hit, peaking at number 54 in the UK chart.

Track listing

Personnel
Joan Armatrading – 12-string acoustic guitar, vocals
Chris Spedding – guitar
Hiram Bullock – guitar
Richard Hirsh – guitar (3)
Danny Federici – organ
Paul Shaffer – piano
Clifford Carter – piano (6) 
Phillip St. John – piano (4)
Tom Sowell – synthesiser
Clarence Clemons – saxophone
Will Lee – bass
Marcus Miller – bass (1, 4)
Anton Fig – drums
George Kerr, Sammy Turner – background vocals (5)
Technical
Thom Panunzio – engineer
Gregg Caruso – assistant engineer
Chuck Beeson – art direction, design
Brian Hagiwara – photography

Charts

Weekly charts

Year-end charts

Certifications

References

1980 albums
Joan Armatrading albums
Albums produced by Richard Gottehrer
Albums recorded at Record Plant (New York City)
A&M Records albums